Doodle Do is a British 2006 television programme targeted to and designed for pre-school children. It aired on the CBeebies channel between 2006 and 2010. The programme features three "Doodle Doers" — puppets called "Dib-Dab", "Scribble" and "Stick" — who interact with a human presenter, Chris (played by Chris Corcoran, a Welsh stand-up comedian). The programme first aired on 30 January 2006 on the CBeebies channel at 9am and again at 1pm and 5pm Local Time.

Format
Dib-Dab, Scribble and Stick are literal glove hand creatures, as they consist of colourful knitted gloves decorated with eyes, noses, and hair. They are each operated by three puppeteers who remain concealed behind features of the studio set, such as curtains or boxes, or beneath the raised studio floor. One episode was filmed in the French Ski Resort of 'Les Deux Alpes'.

The programme is a loose "how to" arts feature similar to SMarteenies, but aimed at an even younger audience. Chris and the puppets explore making models from boxes, simple collages and so on. A story or game is featured, during which the puppets play characters using the items they have created.

The programme always ends with some "Doodle do" and "Doodle don't" advice, such as "Doodle do: have fun with your model car, and doodle don't: forget to tidy up afterwards".

There are also small 5-minute portions of the show called "Doodle Do Making Moments" which are broadcast. These feature one "make" and do not have much of a storyline.

The three puppets all have distinctive personalities. Dib-Dab (voiced by Yvonne Stone) is giddily enthusiastic, concerned for others and loves the colour pink so much, that whenever it seems someone else is going to get the pink paper, she will whimper with misery and longing; Scribble (voiced by Adam Carter) is a bit of a comedian with a fondness for puns; and Stick (voiced by Mark Mander) is rather anxious (similar to George from Rainbow, whom Mark Mander has also "played"), and often needs to be reassured by Chris. Stick enjoys chanting the word "Blob" whilst painting or glueing, and seems to get into a trance-like state doing so. After the children making clips, Dib-Dab, Scribble and Stick sit by the treasure chest, the treasure chest will open and an animation about sandworms drawing an object features in each episode.

Cast and Crew 

Presenter: Chris Corcoran
Dib-Dab: Yvonne Stone
Scribble: Adam Carter and Don Austen
Stick: Mark Mander
Writers: Dean Wilkinson, Trevor Neal, Simon Hickson
Music: Richie Webb

Episodes
Box Snake
Handprint Fish
Envelope Puppets
Blowing Pictures
Paper Plate Kite
Gravity Dribble Picture
Headband Decoration
Wool Collage
Colour Snap Cards
Box Building Blocks
Bottle Faces
Treasure Box
Rainstick
Foil Sculptures
Finger Painting Prints
Bird Feeder
Dipping Pictures
Parrots On A Perch
Funny Wig
Beach Picture
Paint ‘n’ Peel Pictures
Jelly Fish
Salt Water Dough
Animals Out Of Pebbles
Streamer Flag
Winter Special
Circle Printing
Ball Biscuit Tin 
Cup and Ball Game
Spray and Splatter
Tissue Paper Stained Glass
Nature Collage
Spiders Web
Chalk Smudge
Ice Cube Drawing
Tissue Box Clown Shoes

Award nominations 
 BAFTA Children's Awards 2006
 Nominated for Best Pre-school Live Action Series

References

External links
CBeebies - Doodle Do at bbc.co.uk

2000s British children's television series
2010s British children's television series
British preschool education television series
British television shows featuring puppetry
British television series with live action and animation
BBC children's television shows
CBeebies
2000s preschool education television series
2010s preschool education television series
Television series by BBC Studios
English-language television shows